"Fly Together" is a 2011 song by American hip hop recording artist Red Café, intended as the promotional single off an unreleased debut studio album ShakeDown. The song features rapper Rick Ross along with vocals and production from Ryan Leslie.

Remix
On December 9, 2011 a remix was released, featuring Trey Songz, Wale & J. Cole. The remix is included on Red Café's third mixtape Hell's Kitchen, which was released on January 13, 2012.

Music video 
On October 7, 2011 a trailer for the music video was released through Café's official YouTube page. The video directed by Colin Tilley, was released October 14, 2011.

Chart performance 
"Fly Together" first charted on the U.S. Billboard R&B/Hip-Hop Songs on the week of September 12, 2011 at number sixty-six. It has since peaked at number forty-four The song is Red Café's highest charting single to date.

Charts

Radio and release history

References 

2011 singles
2011 songs
Rick Ross songs
Ryan Leslie songs
Song recordings produced by Ryan Leslie
Songs written by Ryan Leslie
Music videos directed by Colin Tilley
Songs written by Rick Ross